Simón Bolívar is a training vessel for the Venezuelan Navy. She sails from the home port of La Guaira and is a frequent participant in tall ship events. She is named after Simón Bolívar, the liberator of Bolivia, Colombia, Peru, Ecuador, Panama and Venezuela.

Design
Simón Bolívar was built in the Spanish shipyard of Astilleros Celaya in Bilbao (Spain).  She is one of four similar barques built as sail training vessels for Latin American navies; her half-sisters are the Mexican Cuauhtémoc, the Colombian Gloria and the Ecuadoran Guayas. Their design is similar to the 1930 designs of the German firm Blohm & Voss, like Gorch Fock,  and the NRP Sagres. She was launched in Bilbao on 21 November 1979.

History
She was commissioned on 12 August 1980.  She participated in Operation Sail in 1986 and again in 2000, visiting New York City on both occasions. She formed part of the French Voiles de la liberté in 1989, Armada de la liberté in 1994 and Armada du siècle in 1999.

In 1995 she won the golden prize in the international Americas' Sail tall ship race.

From 2002 until 2008 she was in refit at Diques y Astilleros Nacionales Compañía Anónima state shipyard in Puerto Cabello.

She participated in Velas Sudamerica 2010, an historical Latin American tour by eleven tall ships to celebrate the bicentennial of the first national governments of Argentina, Venezuela, Colombia, Chile and Mexico .

In 2011 she travelled to the Azores, Bremerhaven, Saint Petersburg and Cadiz, sailing from her homeport of La Guaira on 25 February and returning on 15 June.

It is classified as a Class A Tall Ship by the International Sail Training Association and has the MMSI number 735059037.

See also
List of large sailing vessels
List of tall ships

Notes

References

External links

1979 ships
Ships built in Spain
Individual sailing vessels
Sailing ships of Venezuela
Sail training ships
Tall ships of Venezuela
Ships of the Bolivarian Navy of Venezuela